This is a list of sites listed on the National Register of Historic Places in Cambridge, Massachusetts.  This is intended to be a complete list of the properties and districts on the National Register of Historic Places in Cambridge, Massachusetts, United States.  Latitude and longitude coordinates are provided for many National Register properties and districts; these locations may be seen together in an online map.

There are 206 properties and districts listed on the National Register in Cambridge, including 18 National Historic Landmarks.

Current listings

|}

Former listing

|}

See also

Blue plaque
List of National Historic Landmarks in Massachusetts
National Register of Historic Places listings in Massachusetts
National Register of Historic Places listings in Middlesex County, Massachusetts

References

External links
Historic Marker Program, Cambridge Historical Commission
Protected property list of Cambridge

Cambridge
History of Cambridge, Massachusetts
Cambridge, Massachusetts